Garry Davidson (10 February 1954 – 26 November 2020) was an Australian rules footballer who played for Geelong and Richmond in the Victorian Football League (VFL) during the 1970s.

Originally from Devonport, Davidson was at Geelong for three seasons and twice kicked four goals in a game. His second VFL stint, which came four years after leaving Geelong, was with Richmond. He also played with Caulfield in the Victorian Football Association (VFA).

Davidson coached Glenorchy to a Tasmanian Football League premiership in 1983 and also North Hobart to TFL Statewide premierships in 1987 and 1989. He was named, in 2000, as an assistant coach in North Hobart's official 'Team of the Century'.

He has since served as the football manager at Geelong in the AFL and in 2006 was inducted into the Tasmanian Football Hall of Fame for his career as a coach.

Davidson's son Tom Davidson played one Australian Football League (AFL) game for Collingwood.

References

External links

Holmesby, Russell and Main, Jim (2007). The Encyclopedia of AFL Footballers. 7th ed. Melbourne: Bas Publishing.

1954 births
2020 deaths
Geelong Football Club administrators
Geelong Football Club players
Richmond Football Club players
Devonport Football Club players
North Hobart Football Club coaches
Glenorchy Football Club coaches
Glenorchy Football Club players
Australian rules footballers from Tasmania
Tasmanian Football Hall of Fame inductees